Munster Township is a township in Cambria County, Pennsylvania, United States. The population was 690 at the 2010 census. It is part of the Johnstown, Pennsylvania Metropolitan Statistical Area.

The township was perhaps named after the province of Munster in Ireland.

Geography
The unincorporated community of Munster is in the center of the township. U.S. Route 22, a four-lane expressway, crosses the center of the township from east to west, with one exit at the village of Munster.

Communities

Unincorporated communities

 Luckett
 Munster

Demographics

As of the census of 2000, there were 675 people, 227 households, and 177 families residing in the township.  The population density was 47.8 people per square mile (18.4/km).  There were 240 housing units at an average density of 17.0/sq mi (6.6/km).  The racial makeup of the township was 99.56% White, 0.15% African American, and 0.30% from two or more races.

There were 227 households, out of which 37.0% had children under the age of 18 living with them, 68.7% were married couples living together, 5.7% had a female householder with no husband present, and 22.0% were non-families. 18.5% of all households were made up of individuals, and 7.5% had someone living alone who was 65 years of age or older.  The average household size was 2.95 and the average family size was 3.38.

In the township the population was spread out, with 25.6% under the age of 18, 11.3% from 18 to 24, 27.3% from 25 to 44, 25.2% from 45 to 64, and 10.7% who were 65 years of age or older.  The median age was 37 years. For every 100 females, there were 101.5 males.  For every 100 females age 18 and over, there were 100.8 males.

The median income for a household in the township was $42,188, and the median income for a family was $45,000. Males had a median income of $31,667 versus $19,833 for females. The per capita income for the township was $15,762.  About 4.8% of families and 6.7% of the population were below the poverty line, including none of those under age 18 and 7.4% of those age 65 or over.

References

1854 establishments in Pennsylvania
Townships in Cambria County, Pennsylvania
Townships in Pennsylvania